F Renault engine (F for fonte, French for cast iron) is an automotive internal combustion engine, four-stroke, inline-four engine bored directly into the iron block, water cooled, with overhead camshaft driven by a timing belt, and with an aluminum cylinder head, developed and produced by Renault in the early '80s, making its appearance on the Renault 9 and 11. This engine is available in petrol and diesel versions, with 8 or 16 valves.

History 
Known as "F8M", the new engine was designed by engineer George Douin and his team and broke with tradition by featuring no removable cylinder liners, thanks to advances in metals technology that significantly slow the wear of rubbing mechanical parts. The new 4- cylinder unit adopted an overhead camshaft driven by a toothed belt that also controls the diesel injection pump. A second belt rotates the alternator and water pump, while a vacuum pump located at the rear operates the brake servo. The cast iron block is topped by a light alloy cylinder head featuring Ricardo Comet prechambers. The engine is mounted transversely inclined rearwards 12°. A few months after the release of the Renault 9 Diesel, the Renault 11 was launched in April 1983, the diesel version being introduced in autumn 1983.

In the autumn of 1983, Renault launched the  F2N petrol engine, using the block of the F8M. It has a diesel-type architecture, with combustion chambers integrated with the piston design. Since the petrol version does not require water channels in the block, a bigger bore was possible than in the smaller diesel version. It first appeared in twin carburettor form in the Renault 11 GTX, TXE, and the TXE Electronic with digital meter and speech synthesis. In February 1984, " F2N " was added to the Renault 9 GTX and TXE. This engine was called the B172 by Volvo.

Thereafter, the F8M was also used in the Renault 5 Express (Rapid/Extra), and the Volvo 300 series. The F2N was installed in the Renault 21, Renault 5, Renault 19, Renault Clio, Volvo 340/360 and also the Volvo 400 series (where it was designated B18KP by Volvo). A version with a single-barrel carburetor was installed in some early Renault Trafic models and some R21, called the F1N. The  petrol version was also built with multi-point fuel injection as the F3N. This was fitted to the U.S. versions of the Renault 9 and Renault 11 (Renault Alliance and Encore), as well as to GTE models of the Renault 5 and 11 sold in some countries such as Switzerland and Germany - as the old carburetted turbo Cléon-Fonte engines no longer met the pollution standards in these countries.

Volvo built turbocharged versions of the F2N with multipoint fuel injection (designated "B18FT"), installed in the Volvo 480 Turbo, the 440 Turbo Volvo and Volvo 460 Turbo. These engines are sought after to fit to Renault 5 GT Turbo, Renault 9 Turbo and Renault 11 Turbo.

Production is centered on Renault's engine manufacturing facility at Cléon, near Rouen in Normandy.

Evolution

Diesel versions 
Beginning in 1987, the 1.6D undergoes changes to make it more quiet. This F8M second generation will unfortunately be weaker at the cylinder head and head gasket. More asbestos will be dropped, which will exacerbate the problems of cylinder head gaskets. Externally, a second generation F8M detected by its cylinder head cover 6 which is secured by small screws, while a first generation F8M 3 has closed nuts for securing the valve cover, the housing for dispensing a F8M second generation part has a non-painted around the injection pump, while a first generation F8M the casing has completely black distribution.

In 1988, Renault launched the Renault 19 in place of R9 and R11, the F8M 1.6 D developing  diesel engine of its predecessors is not powerful enough to equip the heavier R19, Renault changes the stroke and bore of the 1.6 D, to obtain  (1.9 D) which will give rise to F8Q developing . This engine will also eventually equip the Clio 1, Clio 2 Express (Rapid / Extra), R21, Kangoo, Mégane 1 and Trafic 1. A lower power version producing  DIN will appear in the 90s. The second generation F8Q cylinder heads and head-gaskets were problematic.

At the end of 1988, a turbocharged version of the 1.9 D is sold on the R19, the engine will F8QT engine types, it will develop  DIN. It will also equip Mégane 1, and the Volvo 440, Volvo 460, Volvo S40 and V40, and Mitsubishi Carisma.

In the fall of 1997, Renault introduced the 1.9 dT their first Direct injection version of the engine, the 1.9 dTi, designated F9Q engine type. It will equip the Mégane 1, 1 Scénic, Laguna 1, Clio Kangoo 1 and 2, Mitsubishi Carisma and the Volvo S40 and V40.

In July 1999, the 1.9 dTi was upgraded to common rail higher pressure injection, Renault's the first dCi engine, the 1.9 dCi version of the F9Q. It will appear on the Laguna 1 Phase 2. The 1.9 dCi also equip the last two phases 1 Mégane, Scénic 1 Phase 2, Laguna 2, 2 Mégane, Scénic 2, Area 3, Area 4, Trafic 2, Master 2, Volvo S40, Volvo V40, Mitsubishi Carisma,    Suzuki Grand Vitara, and Nissan Primera ...

Gasoline versions 
The F3R of  also equip Renault Alliance GTA in North America.

In early 1989 Renault premiered the sports version of the Renault 19, replacing the Renault 9 Turbo and Renault 11 Turbo, although it only went on sale in the second half of 1990. Renault abandons its legendary 1.4 Cléon-Fonte turbo carburetor in favor of a multi-valve engine with multipoint injection, an evolution of the engine of the  F2N. The cast-iron block is topped by a 16-valve alloy cylinder head. This, the F7P engine has  and was also used in the Clio 16S from February 1991, replacing the Super 5 GT Turbo. In July 1992, the Clio 16S and 16S R19 are fitted as standard with a catalytic converter in order to comply with pollution standards applicable from 1 January 1993, losing three horsepower in the process.

Clio Williams appeared in 1993. As its name suggests it, the Renault Clio Williams was not designed to celebrate titles gleaned in Formula 1 with the team of Frank Williams, but before any approval for competition (2500 minimum copies required). In order to run in Group A, Renault needs a 2.0-liter engine to be the best equipped in its class. So starting the engine block F7P the Renault Clio 16S Renault will develop its  F7R . This crankshaft "road" original thus better cash constraints to the increased torque will now reach  at 4,500 rpm. The F7R also equip Mégane 1 and Renault Spider off.

It will bring the engine such as "F3P" on the Renault Clio 1 and 19, and "B18U" on the Volvo 440 and Volvo 460. In contrast, the Renault 21, then at retirement retains its , but with the injection (type motor F3N), Volvo will also retain the  injection (type motor B18EP), alongside the new . In 1994, the Laguna will be equipped with one engine F3P.

Volvo also marketed a  petrol version with multipoint injection, sold as the "B16F" in Volvo nomenclature. It was installed in the Volvo 440 and 460 models. Peculiarly, this engine has the same bore and stroke (and resulting displacement) as the diesel F8M engine.

Version 8 valves engine F7R  will appear on Laguna 1, it will also equip the Mégane 1 Scenic Area 1 and 3, it will be known as "F3R." The Volvo 440, 460 and 480, this engine will be known as "B20F". The new  F3R replaced the old  F3R engine.

The F4P first appeared in 1998, in the Phase 2 model of the first generation Laguna. This new 16 valve  also equips the first Mégane Scénic and the second generation Laguna. At the same time, the bigger F4R is installed in the Laguna and Espace (third generation), the engine is the same size as the F7R  as in the Clio Williams. It ends up also being installed in the second and third generation Mégane as well as the second Laguna. The specificity of F4P and F4R engines is that they have a 16-valve cylinder head, similar to the K4J and K4M versions of K-Type engine, over the F4P and F4R engines share the same distribution kit and even water pump that K-Type engine 16 valves (K4J and K4M).

In 1999, the F5R engine appeared. This is an F7R engine, equipped with direct injection. This 16 valve DI engine is installed in the Mégane coupé and convertible, as well as the Laguna 2. This was the first production French petrol engine with direct injection.

The engine, sourced from the Laguna, was tuned by Mecachrome and fitted with 2-stage variable valve timing on the intake cam, matched inlet and exhaust ports and 4-into-1 exhaust headers. In 2001 the Phase 2 F4R received electronic throttle control. In 2004, the Phase 3 version of the Clio 2 RS gained  for a total of  using 4-2-1 exhaust headers, changes to the intake manifold and exhaust system (the new twin rear mufflers requiring the removal of the spare wheel well in the boot).

The F4R will also be grafted with a turbo, and will be known F4Rt it will equip two Mégane, Laguna 2, Laguna 3 Avantime and Vel Satis, but especially this basis used for the Mégane 2 RS  ( version of the F1 Team R26 and R26.R).

The Mégane RS 3 is presented in March 2009 at the Geneva show.

Cylinder capacities

Discontinued

F1x 
It has a parallel valve engine architecture aspirated by a single-barrel carburetor.

Applications:
 F1N , B x S: .
 1984–1997 Renault Trafic

F2x 

The F2x is an eight-valve SOHC with double-barrel carburetor.

Applications:
 F2N , B x S: .
 1983–1989 Renault R11
 1984–1989 Renault R9
 1986–1995 Renault R21
 1988–1996 Renault R19
 1990–1997 Renault Clio
 1985–1990 Renault Super 5
 1987–1990 Volvo 340/360
F2R , B x S: .
 1986–1993 Renault R21 (No official Renault references known, some says , others ).

F3x 

The F3x is mechanically similar to the F2x, only used a monopoint-EFI system. Some later versions were equipped with multi-point fuel injection. A turbocharged version designed by Porsche was available for the Volvo 400-series.

Applications:
 F3N , B x S: .
 1985–1989 Renault R11
 1985–1989 Renault R9
 1986–1995 Renault R21
 1988–2000 Renault R19
 1985–1993 Renault Super 5
 1985–1987 Renault Alliance/Encore (USA & Canada TBI only)
 1986–1992 Volvo 440/460, Volvo 480
 F3P , B x S: .
 1988–2000 Renault R19
 1992–1997 Renault Clio RSi
 1994–1999 Renault Laguna I
 1993–1996 Volvo 440/460
 F3R , B x S: .
 1987– Renault Alliance GTA Special F3R Variant of F3N for 1987 Spec USA GTA only.
 F3R , B x S: .
 1993–1996 Volvo 440/460, Volvo 480
 1994–2001 Renault Laguna I
 1996–2000 Renault Espace III
 1996–2002 Renault Mégane
 1998–2002 Moskvitch 214145 "Svyatogor" (Russia only)

F5x 
The F5x resembles the F4x mechanically with an architecture of 16 indirect actuated valves and DOHC, but used a "direct injection IDE" fuel system.

Applications:
F5R , B x S: .
 1999–2003 Renault Mégane
 2001–2003 Renault Laguna II

F7x 
The F7x was the first of the F-type engine family with a 16-valve DOHC configuration, the valves were directly actuated by Hydraulic tappets.
both the 1.8l as the 2.0l were equipped with a multi-point fuel injection system.

Applications:
 F7P , B x S: .
 1988–1997 Renault R19
 1991–1996 Renault Clio
 F7R , B x S: .
 1993–1996 Renault Clio Williams
 1996–1999 Renault Mégane
 1995–1999 Renault Sport Spider
 1999–2001 Moskvitch 214242 "Ivan Kalita" (Russia only)

F8x 
The F8x is the indirect injected Diesel version and has an 8-valve SOHC architecture, it uses precombustion chambers to achieve the required air/fuel mixing.

Applications:
 F8M , B x S: .
 1982–1989 Renault R9
 1983–1989 Renault R11
 1985–1996 Renault Super 5
 1986–1994 Renault Express/Rapid/Extra
 1984–1990 Volvo 340/360 ("Volvo D16")
 F8Q , B x S: .
 1991–2000 Renault Express/Rapid/Extra
 1988–2000 Renault R19
 1990–1995 Renault R21
 1991–2001 Renault Clio
 1995–2002 Renault Mégane
 1996–2003 Renault Scénic
 1997–2001 Renault Trafic
 2002–2006 Dacia Pick-Up
 2003–2005 Dacia Solenza
 1994–1998 Mitsubishi Carisma
 2001–2004 Suzuki Samurai (built by Santana)
 1994–1996 Volvo 440/460
 1995–2004 Volvo S40/V40

F9x 
The F9x is the direct injected Diesel version and also features an 8-valve SOHC configuration, it has swirl generating intake ports to create swirling (vortex) of the aspirated air, and either a torodial- or an elsbett- piston bowl to twist the injected fuel vapour, also to achieve the required air/fuel mixing. The diesel fuel is delivered either by a mechanical injection pump or a common rail fuel injection installation.

Applications:
 F9Q , B x S: .
 1995–2012 Renault Mégane
 1999–2002 Renault Espace III
 1996–2003 Renault Scénic I
 1997–2010 Renault Master
 1997–2001 Renault Laguna I
 1998–2004 Mitsubishi Carisma
 1998–2004 Mitsubishi Spacestar
 1998–2004 Volvo S40
 2001–2005 Renault Laguna II
 2001–2012 Renault Clio
 2001–2006 Renault Trafic II
 2001–2006 Vauxhall Vivaro
 2001–2006 Opel Vivaro
 2002–2005 Nissan Interstar X70
 2002–2006 Nissan Primastar
 2003–2009 Renault Scénic II
 2005–2015 Suzuki Grand Vitara
 2009–2011 Renault Scénic III

In production

F4x 
The F4x is an indirect actuated 16-valve DOHC with a multi-point fuel injection system.

 F4P , B x S: .
 1998–2001 Renault Laguna I
 2001–2005 Renault Laguna II
 2002 Proton Waja 1.8L
 F4R , B x S: .
 1998–2000 Renault Laguna I
 2002–2007 Renault Laguna II
 2003– Renault Mégane
 2003– Renault Scénic
 1998–2014 Renault Espace
 2000– Renault Clio Renault Sport (172, 182, 197 and 200)
 2000– Renault Trafic (120)
 2000– Formula Renault 2.0 
 2010– Dacia Duster
 2013– Praga R1 
 2014– Ermini Seiottosei
 2015– Sandero R.S. 2.0
 2017– Renault Captur (Brazil)
 F4Rt , B x S: .
 2002–2003 Renault Avantime
 2002–2009 Renault Vel Satis
 2002–2014 Renault Espace
 2002–2007 Renault Laguna II - Twin-scroll turbo by Mitsubishi with 165-180 hp (with overboost 190 hp on TCe 180) 
2003– Renault Scénic II - Twin-scroll turbo by Mitsubishi with 165-180 hp (with overboost 190 hp on TCe 180) 
 2003– Renault Mégane II Sport /
2005–2007 Renault Laguna II GT 
2007–2015 Renault Laguna III 170 bhp
2008–2015 Renault Laguna III GT 205 bhp
 2009– Renault Mégane R.S. //271 bhp (201 kW; 273 PS)
2010– Renault Mégane III TCe 180,

References 

F
Straight-four engines
Diesel engines by model
Gasoline engines by model